Architrypethelium is a genus of lichen-forming fungi in the family Trypetheliaceae. The genus was circumscribed in 1991 by Dutch lichenologist André Aptroot, with A. seminudum assigned as the type species. It is a segregate of genus Trypethelium.

Species
Architrypethelium barrerae  – Mexico
Architrypethelium columbianum 
Architrypethelium grande 
Architrypethelium hyalinum  – Costa Rica
Architrypethelium lauropaluanum 
Architrypethelium murisporum  – Thailand
Architrypethelium nitens 
Architrypethelium penuriixanthum  – Bolivia
Architrypethelium seminudum 
Architrypethelium uberinum

References

Trypetheliaceae
Lichen genera
Dothideomycetes genera
Taxa described in 1991
Taxa named by André Aptroot